Microsoft Mouse Mischief is an add-in to Microsoft Office PowerPoint 2010 and 2007, the presentation program by Microsoft that is part of the Microsoft Office system. It runs on the Microsoft Windows operating systems Windows XP SP3, Windows Vista and Windows 7. This program will enable teachers to create and insert questions, polls, and drawing activity slides into Office PowerPoint lessons. When the lessons are played, students can actively respond to these slides, individually or in teams, by using their own mice to click, circle, cross out, color in, or draw answers on the screen.

Mouse Mischief emerged from a collaboration between two of Microsoft's research labs in India and China.  In 2006, in response to the high student-to-computer ratio in many schools, Microsoft Research India (IDC) began working on a technical solution that would provide each student with a mouse and a cursor on the screen. They conducted several field studies of multiple-mouse software program and computer-aided education. This was extended by Neema Moraveji, then a researcher with Microsoft Research Asia in Beijing, China, to class-wide interactions using a large display and interaction with PowerPoint. Initial uses were meant to support remote teaching from urban Chinese centers to villages.  The remote-teaching component was soon dropped and utility was observed for in-class interactions.

Further studies by members of the same team were conducting experimenting with mouse-based text entry  and the impact of pointing performance when seeing multiple cursors on-screen.  Further research on Mouse Mischief continued when Moraveji continued research as a doctoral student at Stanford University's Learning Sciences and Technology Design program.

Operation

Like Office PowerPoint presentations, Mouse Mischief lessons consist of a number of individual pages or "slides." The "slide" analogy is a reference to the now obsolete slide projector. Slides may contain text, graphics, and other objects, which may be arranged freely on the slide. Mouse Mischief adds three templates or "slide masters" to the standard PowerPoint templates: yes/no, multiple-choice, and drawing slides. These are the slides that students can click or draw on when then presentation is played.

Use in classrooms

Mouse Mischief has three major benefits as an educational tool for classroom use. First, it engages students. Rather than sitting passively, students can actively participate in lessons, using their hands as well as their minds. Participating with other students, instead of alone at their desks, also engages students. Working simultaneously on the screen in Individual mode with the rest of the class can encourage healthy interest and competition. Working in Mouse Mischief Team mode can help students learn collaboration.

Second, multiple-mouse lessons can help teachers connect with large classes. In classes with low teacher to student ratios, multiple-mouse lessons help teachers get every student involved, and it gives them feedback about each student's grasp of concepts during lessons. In all classes, Mouse Mischief provides teachers with immediate feedback on the understanding and progress of the class as a whole. Using this information, the teacher can adjust the lesson to make it clearer, to review specific parts, or to add more examples.

Third, Mouse Mischief can help provide access to technology for more students, even when resources are limited. A Windows MultiPoint technology, Mouse Mischief enables large groups of students to gain computer practice by taking advantage of computers already in the classroom. Unlike clickers, which are used in other classroom response systems, mice connected to the teacher's computer are relatively inexpensive and readily available.

Criticism of Mouse Mischief
Some educators point out that Mouse Mischief doesn't allow for full student anonymity during the presentation. This, and the fact that Mouse Mischief does not have a reporting feature to highlight and gauge which student answered which question.

See also
Interactive Whiteboard
Audience Response Systems
Presentation Software
Learning Management System

References

Neema Moraveji, Taemie Kim, James Ge, Udai Singh Pawar, Kathleen Mulcahy, and Kori Inkpen. 2008. Mischief: supporting remote teaching in developing regions. In Proceedings of the twenty-sixth annual SIGCHI conference on Human factors in computing systems (CHI '08). ACM, New York, NY, USA, 353-362. DOI=10.1145/1357054.1357114 http://doi.acm.org/10.1145/1357054.1357114
Saleema Amershi, Meredith Ringel Morris, Neema Moraveji, Ravin Balakrishnan, and Kentaro Toyama. 2010. Multiple mouse text entry for single-display groupware. In Proceedings of the 2010 ACM conference on Computer supported cooperative work (CSCW '10). ACM, New York, NY, USA, 169-178. DOI=10.1145/1718918.1718950 http://doi.acm.org/10.1145/1718918.1718950
Neema Moraveji, Robb Lindgren, and Roy Pea. 2009. Organized mischief: comparing shared and private displays on a collaborative learning task. In Proceedings of the 9th international conference on Computer supported collaborative learning - Volume 2 (CSCL'09), Angelique Dimitracopoulou, Claire O'Malley, Daniel Suthers, and Peter Reimann (Eds.), Vol. 2. International Society of the Learning Sciences 65-67.
Neema Moraveji, Kori Inkpen, Ed Cutrell, and Ravin Balakrishnan. 2009. A mischief of mice: examining children's performance in single display groupware systems with 1 to 32 mice. In Proceedings of the 27th international conference on Human factors in computing systems (CHI '09). ACM, New York, NY, USA, 2157-2166. DOI=10.1145/1518701.1519030 http://doi.acm.org/10.1145/1518701.1519030

External links
Mouse Mischief blog
Official Mouse Mischief website

Microsoft Office-related software